Monte Cristo Esporte Clube, better known as Monte Cristo, is a football club in the city of Goiânia, in the state of Goiás.

History

Founded on January 26, 1970,  Monte Cristo currently disputes the third division of Campeonato Goiano 2021.

Title
 Campeonato Goiano (Second Division) (1980)

Players

Squad 2021

References 

Football clubs in Goiás